The Isle of Retribution is a 1926 American silent adventure film directed by James P. Hogan and starring Lillian Rich, Robert Frazer and Victor McLaglen.

Cast
 Lillian Rich as Bess Gilbert 
 Robert Frazer as Ned Cornet 
 Victor McLaglen as Doomsdorf 
 Mildred Harris as Lenore Hardenworth 
 Kathleen Kirkham as Mrs. Hardenworth - Lenore's Mother 
 David Torrence as Godfrey Cornet 
 Inez Gomez as Sindy

References

Bibliography
 Munden, Kenneth White. The American Film Institute Catalog of Motion Pictures Produced in the United States, Part 1. University of California Press, 1997.

External links

1926 films
1926 adventure films
American adventure films
American silent feature films
1920s English-language films
Films directed by James Patrick Hogan
Film Booking Offices of America films
American black-and-white films
1920s American films
Silent adventure films